Glennon Doyle (born March 20, 1976) is an American author and activist known for her #1 New York Times bestsellers Untamed, Love Warrior, and Carry On, Warrior. Doyle is also the creator of the online community Momastery, and is the founder and president of Together Rising, an all-women-led nonprofit organization supporting women, families, and children in crisis.

Early life and education 

Doyle was born in Burke, Virginia, and was raised with one sister, Amanda Doyle. She writes and speaks frequently about early struggles with bulimia  and addiction. In her 2013 TEDx talk "Lessons from the Mental Hospital", she discusses time spent in a mental hospital when she was a teenager. She completed her Bachelor of Arts degree at James Madison University in 1999.   Following graduation, she became a teacher in Northern Virginia.

Career 
In 2009, Doyle began writing online with her blog Momastery as a way to share "a look at her life as a progressive Christian raising three children." This  was the start of her writing career and led to her   first book, a memoir titled Carry On, Warrior, in 2013. This book unifies faith with themes of honesty and authenticity, but her subsequent writings shift further away from having a core religious focus.

In 2016, a follow-up memoir, Love Warrior was released. In September 2016, it was selected to be a part of Oprah's Book Club 2.0.

A third memoir, Untamed, was published in 2020.   In April 2020, the book was selected to be a part of Reese Witherspoon's Reese's Book Club (Hello Sunshine • Book Club).

Untamed has sold more than two million copies as of February 2021. A television series based on Untamed is being developed by J. J. Abrams’s production company, with Sarah Paulson expected to be the lead. Sarah Paulson was the only actress to audition for the role, and Doyle said Paulson is the perfect actress to play her because she is "somebody who is a transformational actor, who is in touch with the world and involved in everything we care about, and who is queer".

In May 2021, Doyle launched a podcast titled We Can Do Hard Things. This podcast stars Doyle's wife, Abby Wambach, and sister, Amanda. It carries similar themes to Untamed.

Doyle has also made several appearances on the Together Live Tour, created by Jennifer Rudolph Walsh. The Together Live Tour is a storytelling event aimed at connecting communities and helping each other find purpose. Doyle has appeared on this tour alongside Latham Thomas, Connie Britton, and Sophia Bush.

Awards and recognition 
In 2014, Parents magazine named Doyle and Momastery the winner of its award for Best All-Around at Social Media. In 2021, Doyle was included in the Fast Company Queer 50 list.

Doyle appears on Oprah's SuperSoul 100,  .

She has additionally been featured in O, The Oprah Magazine, The Atlantic, Newsweek, and Glamour, and has also appeared on multiple talk shows.Her online following doubled after the release of her third memoir, Untamed''. She has 2 million followers on Instagram, and 319 thousand on Twitter.

Philanthropy 
Doyle founded Together Rising, a 501(c)(3) nonprofit organization, with an effective date of May 25, 2012.  As of December 2020, Together Rising has raised over $25 million for people in need. Together Rising exists to "transform collective heartbreak into effective action." Most of Together Rising’s funds are raised through time-limited crowd-sourced fund-raisers in which contributors are limited to giving a maximum of $25 to meet a particular need. This strategy is designed to build community, to enable people from all income groups to be able to donate ("democratize the giving"), and overcome indecision about how much to give. 

In 2020, Doyle became a co-owner of the Angel City Football Club in Los Angeles, California.

Personal life 

Doyle was married to Craig Melton, a former model, from 2002 to 2016; and they have three children. The family moved from Centreville, Virginia, to Naples, Florida.

Doyle met Abby Wambach on a book tour. In November 2016, Doyle announced that she was in a relationship with Wambach; they married on May 14, 2017. They moved to Hermosa Beach, California in 2021, purchasing a $6.5 million home. 

Doyle, Wambach, and Melton currently "co-parent" the three children and she states that they all have family dinners together.

Published works

References

External links

 
 We Can Do Hard Things podcast

1976 births
Living people
21st-century American memoirists
American women bloggers
American bloggers
21st-century American women writers
American women memoirists
People from Burke, Virginia
Writers from Virginia
James Madison University alumni
Journalists from Virginia
LGBT people from Virginia
American LGBT journalists
American LGBT writers